Wuping ( unless otherwise noted) may refer to:

Wuping (570–576), era name used by Gao Wei, emperor of Northern Qi
Wuping Jiedushi, a successor state of Ma Chu during the 10th century

Places in China
Wuping County, a county in western Fujian
Wuping, Chongqing, a town in Fengdu County, Chongqing
Wuping, Gansu (武坪), a town in Zhugqu County, Gansu
Wuping, Guangxi, a town in Jingxi, Guangxi

See also
Wu Ping (born 1966?), a Chinese woman who held out her property in Chongqing